The 74th parallel north is a circle of latitude that is 74 degrees north of the Earth's equatorial plane, in the Arctic. It crosses the Atlantic Ocean, Europe, Asia, the Arctic Ocean, and North America.

At this latitude the sun is visible for 24 hours, 0 minutes during the summer solstice and nautical twilight during the winter solstice.

Around the world
Starting at the Prime Meridian and heading eastwards, the parallel 74° north passes through:

{| class="wikitable plainrowheaders"
! scope="col" width="125" | Co-ordinates
! scope="col" | Country, territory or sea
! scope="col" | Notes
|-valign="top"
| style="background:#b0e0e6;" | 
! scope="row" style="background:#b0e0e6;" | Atlantic Ocean
| style="background:#b0e0e6;" | Greenland Sea Norwegian Sea
|-
| style="background:#b0e0e6;" | 
! scope="row" style="background:#b0e0e6;" | Barents Sea
| style="background:#b0e0e6;" |
|-
| 
! scope="row" | 
| Novaya Zemlya - Severny Island
|-
| style="background:#b0e0e6;" | 
! scope="row" style="background:#b0e0e6;" | Kara Sea
| style="background:#b0e0e6;" |
|-
| 
! scope="row" | 
| Rastorguyev Island
|-
| style="background:#b0e0e6;" | 
! scope="row" style="background:#b0e0e6;" | Kara Sea
| style="background:#b0e0e6;" | Pyasina Bay
|-
| 
! scope="row" | 
| Taymyr Peninsula, passing through Lake Taymyr
|-
| style="background:#b0e0e6;" | 
! scope="row" style="background:#b0e0e6;" | Laptev Sea
| style="background:#b0e0e6;" | Passing just south of Bolshoy Begichev Island, 
|-
| 
! scope="row" | 
| New Siberian Islands - Stolbovoy Island
|-
| style="background:#b0e0e6;" | 
! scope="row" style="background:#b0e0e6;" | Laptev Sea
| style="background:#b0e0e6;" |
|-
| 
! scope="row" | 
| New Siberian Islands - Little Lyakhovsky Island
|-
| style="background:#b0e0e6;" | 
! scope="row" style="background:#b0e0e6;" | East Siberian Sea
| style="background:#b0e0e6;" |
|-
| style="background:#b0e0e6;" | 
! scope="row" style="background:#b0e0e6;" | Arctic Ocean
| style="background:#b0e0e6;" |
|-
| style="background:#b0e0e6;" | 
! scope="row" style="background:#b0e0e6;" | Beaufort Sea
| style="background:#b0e0e6;" |
|-
| 
! scope="row" | 
| Northwest Territories - Banks Island
|-
| style="background:#b0e0e6;" | 
! scope="row" style="background:#b0e0e6;" | Viscount Melville Sound
| style="background:#b0e0e6;" |
|-
| 
! scope="row" | 
| Nunavut - Russell Island
|-
| style="background:#b0e0e6;" | 
! scope="row" style="background:#b0e0e6;" | Parry Channel
| style="background:#b0e0e6;" |
|-
| 
! scope="row" | 
| Nunavut - Somerset Island
|-
| style="background:#b0e0e6;" | 
! scope="row" style="background:#b0e0e6;" | Parry Channel
| style="background:#b0e0e6;" |
|-
| 
! scope="row" | 
| Nunavut - Prince Leopold Island
|-
| style="background:#b0e0e6;" | 
! scope="row" style="background:#b0e0e6;" | Lancaster Sound
| style="background:#b0e0e6;" |
|-
| style="background:#b0e0e6;" | 
! scope="row" style="background:#b0e0e6;" | Baffin Bay
| style="background:#b0e0e6;" |
|-
| 
! scope="row" | 
| Ikermiorsuaq
|-
| 
! scope="row" | 
| Waltershausen Glacier
|-
| style="background:#b0e0e6;" | 
! scope="row" style="background:#b0e0e6;" | Atlantic Ocean
| style="background:#b0e0e6;" | Greenland Sea
|-
|}

See also
73rd parallel north
75th parallel north

n74
Geography of the Arctic